The 2015 season was PDRM FA's 1st season in the Malaysia Super League after having been promoted from the Malaysia Premier League as champions.

Kit and sponsorship 
 Kit Supplier: Line Seven 
 Sponsor: Perkasa Jauhari

Coaching staff

Pre-season and friendlies

Competitions

Overview

{| class="wikitable" style="text-align: center"
|-
!rowspan=2|Competition
!colspan=8|Record
|-
!
!
!
!
!
!
!
!
|-
| Super League

|-
| FA Cup

|-
| Malaysia Cup

|-
! Total

Malaysia Super League

League table

Results summary

Results by matchday

Matches

Malaysia FA Cup

Malaysia Cup

Squad statistics

Appearances and goalscorers

Disciplinary record 

** Players who no longer play for PDRM's current season

Transfers

In

Out

References 

2015
Malaysian football clubs 2015 season